Petukhovsky, Petukhovskaya, or Petukhovskoye may refer to:
Petukhovsky District, a district of Kurgan Oblast, Russia

See also
Petukhovsky (rural locality), a list of several rural localities in Russia
Petukhovo, a list of several inhabited localities in Russia